Bump is a studio album by jazz guitarist John Scofield that was released by Verve on March 14, 2000.

Track listing

Personnel
 John Scofield – electric guitar, acoustic guitar
 David Livolsi – bass guitar
 Tony Scherr – bass guitar, double bass
 Chris Wood – bass guitar
 Eric Kalb – drums
 Kenny Wollesen – drums
 Johnny Durkin – congas
 Johnny Almendra – percussion
 Mark Degli Antoni – keyboard sampler

References 

2000 albums
 Jazz fusion albums by American artists
 Verve Records albums
 John Scofield albums